Events from the year 1891 in Japan.

Incumbents
Emperor: Emperor Meiji
Prime Minister: Yamagata Aritomo (until May 6), Matsukata Masayoshi (starting May 6)

Governors
Aichi Prefecture: Takatoshi Iwamura
Akita Prefecture: Baron Akira Suzuki then Shinichi Hirose then Yasuhiko Hirayama
Aomori Prefecture: Masa Sawa
Ehime Prefecture: Katsumata Minoru
Fukui Prefecture: Toshitsuna Adashi then Nobuaki Makino then Kunizo Arakawa
Fukuoka Prefecture: Yasujo
Fukushima Prefecture: Nobumichi Yamada then Kiyoshi Watanabe
Gifu Prefecture: Toshi Kozaki
Gunma Prefecture: Sato Atasesan then Motootoko Nakamura
Hiroshima Prefecture: Nabeshima Miki
Ibaraki Prefecture: Sadanori Yasuda then Shoichiro Ishii
Iwate Prefecture: Shoichiro Ishii then Ichizo Hattori
Kagawa Prefecture: Yawara Shibahara then Masao Tanimori
Kochi Prefecture: Baron Hiroi Hirotake
Kumamoto Prefecture: Takaaki Tomioka then Matsudaira Masanao
Kyoto Prefecture: Baron Kokudo Kitagaki
Mie Prefecture: Shangyi Narukawa
Miyagi Prefecture: Matsudaira Masanao then Mamoru Funakoshi
Miyazaki Prefecture: Takayoshi Kyoganu then Yakichi Nagamine
Nagano Prefecture: Baron Utsumi Tadakatsu then Baron Utsumi Tadakatsu
Niigata Prefecture: Senda Sada Akatsuki then Baron Seung Zhi Kuwata
Oita Prefecture: Ryokichi Nishimura then Baron Shirane Senitsu
Okinawa Prefecture: Kanji Maruoka
Osaka Prefecture: Sutezo Nishimura then Nobumichi Yamada
Saga Prefecture: Sukeo Kabayama
Saitama Prefecture: Eitaro Komatsubara then Kanichi Kubota
Shiname Prefecture: Sada Kotedayasu then Goro Shinozaki
Tochigi Prefecture: Orita Hirauchi
Tokyo: Tomita Tetsunosuke
Toyama Prefecture: Fujishima Masaki then Moriyama Shigeru
Yamagata Prefecture: Moriyama Shigeru

Events
Mino–Owari earthquake

Births
June 2 - Takijirō Ōnishi, admiral known as the father of the kamikaze (d. 1945)
July 7 - Tadamichi Kuribayashi, general and haiku poet (d. 1945)
August 25 - Yoshihide Hayashi, general (d. 1978)
September 27 - Sōsaku Suzuki, general (d. 1978)
October 12 - Fumimaro Konoe, prime minister during World War II (died 1945)
October 15 - Tadashige Daigo, vice-admiral (d. 1947))
October 17 - Yasuyo Yamasaki, general (d. 1945)
December 6 - Masatomi Kimura, admiral (d. 1960}

Deaths
February 18 – Sanjō Sanetomi (b. 1837)

References

 
1890s in Japan
Years of the 19th century in Japan